Shree Renuka Sugars Ltd. is India's largest sugar refiner and ethanol producer based in Mumbai, Maharashtra, with refining capacity of 4000 tonnes/day and distillery capacity of 600 kilolitre/day. It accounted for 20% of India's international sugar contribution in 2019. The current share price as on June, 30 is 39.35 & face value of share is Re.1.

References

External links
 Official website

Chemical companies of India
Sugar companies of India
Food and drink companies based in Mumbai
Manufacturing companies based in Mumbai
Indian companies established in 1998
Food and drink companies established in 1998
Agriculture companies established in 1998
1998 establishments in Karnataka
Companies listed on the National Stock Exchange of India
Companies listed on the Bombay Stock Exchange